Derek Jefferson (born 5 September 1948) is an English former professional footballer. During his career he made over 150 appearances  for Ipswich Town between 1966 and 1972, where he was nicknamed 'Chopper'.

Career
Jefferson joined Ipswich Town as a youth trainee, before making his senior debut on 28 January 1967 in a 4–1 win over Shrewsbury Town in the FA Cup. Although this was his only appearance in the 1966–67 season, he broke into the first team in the following campaign and was a regular as the club won the Second Division Championship.

After a further four full seasons in the top flight at Portman Road, he moved to fellow Division One club Wolves in October 1972. He immediately made his debut in a 1–1 draw at Manchester City on 7 October and went on to make 24 appearances that season. However, this proved his highest seasonal tally for the Midlanders, as he never became a first choice player, managing 52 appearances in total for the club spread over four years.

Wolves allowed Jefferson to compete in the North American Soccer League in the summer of 1976, and later loaned him out to Sheffield Wednesday during October 1976. The following month, he left Molineux for good when he joined Hereford United, playing in the second tier for the only time in their history. (His son Christopher currently plays for the Hereford-based non-league club Westfields).

After finishing his playing career, Jefferson became Reserve Team manager at Birmingham City under Jim Smith. He left after five years at this post to devote himself to Christian work, which he is still involved with, acting as a sports coach in a church-affiliated program in Solihull.

Personal
Derek is happily married with 6 children

External links 
Derek Jefferson at Pride of Anglia
Derek Jefferson at Sports Pursuits

1948 births
Living people
People from Morpeth, Northumberland
Footballers from Northumberland
Association football defenders
English Football League players
Ipswich Town F.C. players
Wolverhampton Wanderers F.C. players
Sheffield Wednesday F.C. players
Hereford United F.C. players
North American Soccer League (1968–1984) players
Boston Minutemen players
Washington Diplomats (NASL) players
English footballers
English expatriate sportspeople in the United States
Expatriate soccer players in the United States
English expatriate footballers